The Order of Zolfaghar (Neshan-e Zolfaghar) is the highest military honour of Iran. The Order was established in 1856 as the Decoration of the Commander of the Faithful, by  Naser al-Din Shah. It was given its current name in 1925, by  Reza Shah I. It was the pinnacle of the Imperial honours system, and was limited to the Sovereign and the individuals who had performed the most outstanding acts of patriotism on behalf of Persia and Iran.

History
The Order was a military order of Imperial Persia and Iran named after Zulfiqar, "Spine-cleaver", the famous two-pointed sword of Imam Ali, the son-in-law of the Prophet Muhammad. It was founded as the Decoration of the Commander of the Faithful by Naser al-Din Shah Qajar in 1856, to commemorate the recapture of Herat. Reza Shah, the penultimate Shah of Iran, renamed it the Order of Zolfaghar in 1925 and made it an exclusively military order.  

Star
The original Star of the Order comprised an enameled five-pointed star, with an inscription representing the Imam Ali on a red boss in the center, mounted over two crossed curved Zolfaghar swords and a sunburst of rays, as seen in the traditional Lion and Sun symbol.

The Star of the Islamic Republic is larger, simpler and more stylised, comprising a golden eight-pointed star within a silver eight-pointed star; stylised inscriptions on the stars provide decoration and contrast.   

Degrees
The Order consisted of three classes: 
1st Class: worn with a badge and a sash
2nd Class: worn with a collar, as a neck-order
3rd Class: worn as a medal.

It was revived in 2019 when Major General Qasem Soleimani received the decoration, the first time it had been awarded since 1979.

Recipients 
Qasem Soleimani

See also 
 Order of Aftab
 Neshan-e Aqdas
 Order of the Lion and the Sun

References

External links 
Online Gallery of Orders & Decorations of Pahlavi dynasty

Military awards and decorations of Iran